Dream Island is an island lying  south-east of Cape Monaco, off the south-west coast of Anvers Island in Wylie Bay, in the Palmer Archipelago of Antarctica. It was surveyed by the British Naval Hydrographic Survey Unit in 1956-1957 and named by the UK Antarctic Place-Names Committee for its natural features including a cave and, in summer, a small waterfall, with mossy patches and grass.  It lies about 10 km north-west of the United States' Palmer Station.

Important Bird Area
The island has been identified as an Important Bird Area (IBA) by BirdLife International because it supports a breeding colony of about 11,000 pairs of Adélie penguins, as well as smaller numbers of chinstrap penguins.  The site is protected as a Restricted Area under ASMA 7 - Southwest Anvers Island and Palmer Basin.

See also
 Betzel Cove
 List of Antarctic islands south of 60° S

References

Islands of the Palmer Archipelago
Antarctic Specially Managed Areas
Important Bird Areas of Antarctica
Penguin colonies